Chaudhry Mahmood Bashir Virk (born 25 December 1937) is a Pakistani politician who has been a member of the National Assembly of Pakistan since August 2018. Previously, he was a member of the National Assembly  from 1997 to 1999 and again from March 2008 to May 2018.

He served as Federal Minister for Law and Justice, in Abbasi cabinet from January 2018 to May 2018.

His parents, Bashir Ahmed Virk and Amna Bibi, gave refuge to the family of Capt (retd.) Ajit Singh Butalia at Lahore in 1947.

Political career
He was elected to the National Assembly of Pakistan as a candidate of Pakistan Muslim League (N) (PML-N) from Constituency NA-77 (Gujranwala-IV) in 1997 Pakistani general election. He received 64,729 votes and defeated Muhammad Aslam Lone, a candidate of Pakistan Peoples Party (PPP).

He ran for the seat of the National Assembly  as a candidate of PML-N from Constituency NA-97 (Gujranwala-III) in 2002 Pakistani general election, but was unsuccessful. He received 12,491 votes and lost the seat to Chaudhry Shahid Akram Bhinder, a candidate of Pakistan Muslim League (Q).

He was re-elected to the National Assembly as a candidate of PML-N from Constituency NA-97 (Gujranwala-III) in 2008 Pakistani general election. He received 48,701 votes and defeated Zafar Chaudhary, a candidate of PPP.

He was re-elected to the National Assembly as a candidate of PML-N from Constituency NA-97 (Gujranwala-III) in 2013 Pakistani general election. He received 104,638 votes and defeated Rana Naeem Ur Rehman Khan, a candidate of Pakistan Tehreek-e-Insaf.

In January 2018, Virk was inducted into the federal cabinet of Prime Minister Shahid Khaqan Abbasi as a federal minister and was made Minister for Law and Justice. Upon the dissolution of the National Assembly on the expiration of its term on 31 May 2018, Virk ceased to hold the office as Federal Minister for Law and Justice.

He was re-elected to the National Assembly as a candidate of PML-N from Constituency NA-80 (Gujranwala-II) in 2018 Pakistani general election. He received 108,653 votes and defeated Mian Tariq Mehmood.

References

Living people
Pakistan Muslim League (N) politicians
Punjabi people
Pakistani MNAs 2013–2018
1937 births
Pakistani MNAs 2008–2013
Pakistani MNAs 1997–1999
Pakistani MNAs 2018–2023